Maika Sivo (born 3 October 1993) is a Fijian professional rugby league footballer who plays as a er for the Parramatta Eels in the National Rugby League (NRL) and Fiji at international level.

Background
Sivo grew up in Nadi, Fiji. 

Sivo played his junior rugby league for the Gundagai Tigers before playing for St. Mary's in the Ron Massey Cup. He then moved to the Mounties signing with their NSW Cup team in 2016, scoring 35 tries.

Sivo signed with the Penrith Panthers until the end of the 2018 season, scoring 12 tries in his first season with the club's lower grade. In 2018, he signed a two-year deal with the Parramatta Eels.

Playing career

2019
Sivo made his NRL debut in Round 1 of the 2019 NRL season against the Penrith Panthers. He scored his first NRL try against the Sydney Roosters in round 3, scoring two tries in a losing effort.

In Round 6 against Wests Tigers, Sivo scored a try as Parramatta won the match 51–6 in the opening NRL match to be played at the new Western Sydney Stadium.
In Round 8 against St George, Sivo scored 2 tries for Parramatta, one of which was a length of the field try.  Parramatta would go on to win the match 32-18 after being down 14-0 earlier in the game.

In Round 13 against Cronulla-Sutherland,  Sivo scored 2 tries in a losing effort as Parramatta were defeated 42–22.
In Round 19 2019 against the New Zealand Warriors, he palmed off New Zealand player Blake Ayshford on his way to the try line.  Fox Sports commentator Andrew Voss said of Sivo's fend on Ayshford "If you can get a charge for palming blokes in the sternum, Sivo’s looking at 10 weeks,". Sivo later scored a try in a 24–22 victory.

In round 25 against Manly-Warringah, Sivo scored a hat-trick as Parramatta won the match 32–16 at the Western Sydney Stadium. The victory saw Parramatta finish 5th on the table at the end of the regular season.

Sivo finished the 2019 NRL season with 20 tries, one behind Israel Folau's record of 21  in a rookie NRL season.

In the elimination final against Brisbane, Sivo scored two tries as Parramatta won the match 58–0 at the new Western Sydney Stadium.  The victory was the biggest finals win in history, eclipsing Newtown's 55–7 victory over St George in 1944. The match was also Parramatta's biggest victory over Brisbane and Brisbane's worst ever loss since entering the competition in 1988.

2020
In round 8 of the 2020 NRL season, Sivo scored four tries as Parramatta defeated North Queensland 42-4 at Bankwest Stadium.

In round 11 against Wests Tigers, Sivo scored two tries as Parramatta won the game 26-16 at Bankwest Stadium.

In the qualifying final against Melbourne, Sivo injured his leg in the first half of the match and had to be taken from the field.  It was later confirmed Sivo would be ruled out for the remainder of the season with an MCL injury.

2021
In round 2 of the 2021 NRL season, Sivo scored two tries in Parramatta's 16-12 victory over Melbourne. The following day, Sivo re-signed with Parramatta until the end of 2023.

In round 7 against Brisbane, Sivo scored a hat-trick in Parramatta's 46-6 victory over Brisbane.

The following week, he scored another two tries in Parramatta's 32-10 victory over arch-rivals Canterbury-Banksown.

In round 13 against Newcastle, he scored two tries including the 50th try of his career in a 40-4 victory.

In round 14, Sivo scored a try but was later sent to the sin bin for a high tackle on Wests Tigers player Adam Doueihi in a 40-12 victory.  Sivo was later suspended for one match over the incident.

On 24 August, Sivo was ruled out for the remainder of the season after suffering an ACL injury in the club's round 23 victory over North Queensland.

2022
After spending two weeks in the NSW Cup to regain match fitness, Sivo made his return to the Parramatta side in round 14 of the 2022 NRL season against arch-rivals Canterbury.  Parramatta would go on to lose the match 34-4 in an upset defeat.
In round 19, Sivo scored two tries for Parramatta in a 36-14 loss against Brisbane.
The following week, Sivo scored two tries for Parramatta in their 34-10 upset victory over Penrith.
In round 21, Sivo scored a further two tries in Parramatta's 36-20 victory over Manly.
In the 2022 preliminary final, Sivo scored the winning try for Parramatta in their 24-20 upset victory over North Queensland which sent the club into their first grand final since 2009.
Sivo played for Parramatta in their 2022 NRL Grand Final loss to Penrith. In the second half of the match, Sivo dropped the ball over the line when the score was 22-0 in favour of Penrith.  Penrith would score only minutes later to make it 28-0 before winning the match 28-12.
In the second group stage match of the 2021 Rugby League World Cup, Sivo scored two tries for Fiji in their 60-4 victory over Italy.

2023
On 1 March, Sivo signed a contract extension to remain at Parramatta until the end of 2025.
In round 2 of the 2023 NRL season, Sivo scored two tries in a 30-26 loss against Cronulla.
The following week, he scored two tries for Parramatta in their 34-30 loss against Manly at Brookvale Oval.

Controversy
On 28 December 2019, it was reported that Sivo had been arrested whilst on holiday visiting family in Fiji.  Sivo was later charged with one count of indecent annoyance. It was alleged that Sivo harassed a female bartender at a pool party, tugging on her skirt in order to get her attention.  Sivo was granted bail at Nadi Magistrate's Court but was banned from leaving Fiji and was ordered to reappear at court on 7 January 2020.

The Parramatta club released a statement saying "The club takes these incidents seriously and will be monitoring the situation closely, As with any legal matter, it is important that we follow due process, and the club will review all information available regarding the alleged incident.  We are currently providing support to Maika and his family. The club has informed the NRL integrity unit and will be making no further comment at this time".

On 6 January 2020, Sivo had his bail conditions altered so he could return to Australia for Parramatta training.
On 9 March 2020, Sivo was cleared to play by the NRL after it was ruled that he was not subject to the no-fault stand down policy.

References

External links
Eels profile
Fiji profile

1993 births
Living people
Fiji national rugby league team players
Fijian rugby league players
Parramatta Eels players
Rugby league wingers
Sportspeople from Nadi